Senska is a surname. Notable people with the surname include:

Frances Senska (1914–2009), American ceramicist
Pierre Senska (born 1988), German cyclist